Jung Yoo-kyung (born December 8, 1968) is a South Korean television screenwriter.

Filmography

Television 
Salut D'Amour (KBS2, 1994)
The Scent of Apple Blossoms (MBC, 1996)
Yesterday (MBC, 1997)
Forever Yours (MBC, 1998)
Should My Tears Show (MBC, 1999)
Secret (MBC, 2000)I Love You, Hyun-jung (MBC, 2002)Which Star Are You From (MBC, 2006)In-soon Is Pretty (KBS2, 2007)Please Marry Me (KBS2, 2010)You're the Best, Lee Soon-shin (KBS2, 2013)Marriage Contract (MBC, 2016)

 Film Over the Border'' (2006)

References

External links 
 
 
 
 

Living people
1968 births
South Korean screenwriters
South Korean television writers